The 2016 Youngstown State Penguins football team represented Youngstown State University in the 2016 NCAA Division I FCS football season. They were led by second-year head coach Bo Pelini and played their home games at Stambaugh Stadium. They were a member of the Missouri Valley Football Conference. Youngstown State finished the season 12–4 overall with a 6–2 mark in MVFC play to finish in third place. They received an at-large bid to the FCS playoffs, where they defeated Samford, Jacksonville State, Wofford, and Eastern Washington to advance to the National Championship Game, where they lost to James Madison.

Schedule

Source: Schedule

Roster

Game summaries

Duquesne

at West Virginia

Robert Morris

South Dakota

at Illinois State

Northern Iowa

at South Dakota State

Indiana State

at North Dakota State

Southern Illinois

at Missouri State

FCS Playoffs

First Round–Samford

Second Round–Jacksonville State

Quarterfinals–Wofford

Semifinals–Eastern Washington

Championship–James Madison

Ranking movements

References

Youngstown State
Youngstown State Penguins football seasons
Youngstown State
Youngstown State Penguins football